Erzsébeti Torna Club was a Hungarian football club from the town of Pesterzsébet, Budapest.

History
Erzsébeti Torna Club debuted in the 1925–26 season of the Hungarian League and finished ninth.

Name Changes 
1907–1924: Erzsébetfalvi Torna Club
1924: Erzsébetfalva becomes a city as Pesterzsébet
1924–1926: Erzsébeti Torna Club
1926–1927:Pesterzsébet Labdarúgó Szövetség 
1927–1928: Pesterzsébet Futball Szövetkezet 
1928: merger with Húsos FC
1929–1931: Erzsébeti Torna Club
1931–1935: Erzsébeti TC FC
1935: merger with Soroksár FC 
1935–1938: Erzsébet FC
1938: takeover by Lampart FC 
1938–1944: Erzsébeti Torna Club
1945-1945: Erzsébeti MaDISz
1945: merger with Soroksári MaDISz
1945: merger with Erzsébeti Barátság
1945–1947: Erzsébeti Barátság
1947–1949: Erzsébeti TC
1949-1949: Egyenruházati KTSz
1949–1951: Egyenruházati NV SE
1949: merger with Pesterzsébet-Soroksárújfalu 
1951–1952: Vörös Meteor Füszért SK
1952: football department dissolved and merger with XX. ker. Petőfi
1952–1955: XX. ker. Petőfi
1955–1957: XX. ker. Bástya
1957–?: Erzsébeti TC
?-1960: Pesterzsébeti Petőfi SC
1960–1973: Erzsébeti Spartacus
1973: merger with Erzsébeti Spartacus MTK LE

References

External links
 Profile

Football clubs in Hungary